The following highways are numbered 494:

Japan
 Japan National Route 494

United States
  Interstate 494
  Interstate 494 (disambiguation) (cancelled proposals in Illinois)
  Maryland Route 494
  Puerto Rico Highway 494
  Texas State Highway Loop 494